King Salmon River may refer to:
 King Salmon River (Nushagak River tributary)
 King Salmon River (Ugashik River tributary)
 King Salmon River (Egegik River tributary)
 King Salmon River (Admiralty Island)

See also
King Salmon (disambiguation)
King Salmon Creek, in British Columbia, Canada